St Conor's College is a secondary school located in Northern Ireland. It has two sites. The main site is in the village of Clady and a junior site is located in Kilrea.  The school opened in September 2018. It is within the Education Authority (North Eastern) region.

History
The college was formed in 2018 through the amalgamation of St Mary's College, Clady and St. Paul's College, Kilrea.

Academics
The college offers the full range of subjects at Key Stage 3 and 4 and at GCSE A-Level.   With the arrival of the children of Polish immigrants the college provides after school classes in Polish and the students can take a GCSE in Polish.  There is also a Polish Cultural Week.

Sports
Students have the opportunity of participating in a wide range of sporting activities including Gaelic football, hurling, camogie, soccer, athletics, swimming, netball, basketball, and gymnastics. In 2019, the U-14 footballers won the Ulster Gerry Brown Cup, the U-14 hurlers won the Rehill Cup and the Year 8 Camogie team won both the Derry Vocational School 9 a–side competition and the Ulster Colleges Title.

Extra-Curricular
Students are encouraged to participate in various after school activities other than sport.  These include theatre trips, film club, choir, musicals and debating.

See also
List of secondary schools in Northern Ireland

References

Educational institutions established in 2018
Catholic secondary schools in Northern Ireland
Secondary schools in County Londonderry
2018 establishments in Northern Ireland